Petr Holota (born 16 May 1965) is a Czech former football player. He represented Czechoslovakia once, playing against Australia in 1991. He played in the top flight of his country, making more than 200 top-flight appearances spanning the existence of the Czechoslovak First League and the Gambrinus liga.

References

External links
 
 

1965 births
Living people
Czechoslovak footballers
Czech footballers
Czechoslovakia international footballers
Czech First League players
Bohemians 1905 players
SK Slavia Prague players
FK Viktoria Žižkov players
Association football defenders